The Trustbank Tournament of Champions was a professional golf tournament that was held in South Africa between 1985 and 1992. It was played at Kensington Golf Club in Johannesburg and was a fixture on the South African Tour, being the season ending event from 1986 to 1991.

Winners

See also
Holiday Inns Champion of Champions

References 

Former Sunshine Tour events
Golf tournaments in South Africa
Recurring sporting events established in 1985
Recurring sporting events disestablished in 1992